The Yubileinaya mine is a coal mine in the Kemerovo Oblast area of Siberia, Russia. The mine is operated by Yuzhkuzbassugol, part owned by the Evraz Group who plan to take full ownership.

Explosion 
On May 24, 2007, a methane explosion at the mine killed 38 miners and injured a further 7, one of whom subsequently died. Investigators believe that the explosion was caused by a spark from a damaged cable.

See also

 Vorkuta mine disaster—25-29 February 2016, methane explosion, 36 killed
 Raspadskaya mine explosion—8 May 2010, 91 killed
 Ulyanovskaya Mine disaster—19 March 2007, methane explosion, at least 108 killed

References

External links
Evraz Group: Statement re. Yubileinaya mine accident

Explosions in 2007
Coal mines in Russia
Buildings and structures in Kemerovo Oblast
Coal mines in the Soviet Union
Coal mining disasters in Russia
Underground mines in Russia
2007 mining disasters
2007 disasters in Russia